Bernadette Fatima Tecson Romulo-Puyat (born May 14, 1971) is a Filipino government official, economist, and academic who served as the Secretary of Tourism under the Duterte administration from May 2018 to June 2022, heading the Philippines' Tourism industry through the disruptions caused by the COVID-19 pandemic in the Philippines. She has since been appointed Deputy Governor of the Bangko Sentral ng Pilipinas in charge of financial inclusion, regional operations, and the BSP's Program Management Office. Her previous positions include terms as a consultant for the Presidential Management Staff, Undersecretary for the Department of Agriculture, and lecturer at the UP School of Economics.

Early life and education
Bernadette Romulo-Puyat is the fourth amongst the five children of Filipino politician and diplomat, Alberto Romulo and Lovely Tecson. She attended the University of the Philippines Diliman and pursued an undergraduate and a master's degree in economics. She once aspired to become like her mother but later on, considering her exposure and familiarity to politics at early age, she ended up joining the Philippine political scene.

Career

Early career
Romulo-Puyat was an instructor at the UP School of Economics. After being in the academe, she joined politics in 2004 by attempting to become the First District Representative of Quezon City. However, she lost the elections to Vincent Crisologo by 2,000 votes with Puyat readily conceding Crisologo's victory and deciding to thereafter spend more time with her family instead.

As Presidential Management Staff consultant
Puyat also worked with the Presidential Management Staff (PMS) as Deputy Cabinet Secretary and Economic Consultant during the tenure of President Gloria Macapagal Arroyo.

As Agriculture Undersecretary
Puyat became the Undersecretary for Special Concerns at the Department of Agriculture (DA) under the former Secretary Arthur Yap. She ensured that foreign grants were directed accordingly to projects intended for farmers. She also focused on working with the agricultural concerns of women from the rural community that include financing technical support in provision of seedlings, planting materials, fermentation boxes and processing equipment for the Manobo women farmers, promotion and marketing of agricultural products for the coffee farmers across Kalinga, Bukidnon and Mt. Kanlaon; and pili, cacao and cassava farmers across Camarines Sur. She also took part in the establishment of an organic village for indigenous women farmers in Davao.

As Tourism Secretary
Following the resignation of Wanda Teo due to her alleged involvement with issues surrounding a  tourism advertisement placement on People's Television Network (PTV), Bernadette Romulo-Puyat was appointed by President Rodrigo Duterte as Secretary of the Department of Tourism on May 11, 2018. Romulo-Puyat announced her plan to give farm tourism a focus and also made review on the Philippines' possible hosting of the Miss Universe 2018 pageant which her predecessor was involved in. Romulo-Puyat dropped the Philippines' hosting bid due to budgetary concerns.

Within her first month as Tourism Secretary, Romulo-Puyat alleged that corruption is rampant in the DOT claiming the existence of schemes involving "hundred of millions" of funds within the government agency. She ordered the suspension of all projects of the DOT pending review from the Commission on Audit. She also directed all undersecretaries and assistant secretaries, including Cesar Montano and Kat de Castro, to submit their courtesy resignations except for undersecretary Bong Bengzon.

Personal life
Romulo-Puyat was married to David Puyat, a lawyer, until his death in 2010. She has two children.

References

Living people
Secretaries of Tourism of the Philippines
Duterte administration cabinet members
Women members of the Cabinet of the Philippines
University of the Philippines alumni
Benigno Aquino III administration personnel
Arroyo administration personnel
Bongbong Marcos administration personnel
1971 births